</noinclude>

Ivana Havrlíková (born 22 August 1973) is a former professional Czech tennis player. On 2 October 1995, she reached her highest WTA singles ranking of 267.

In 1992 Her only WTA Tour main draw appearance came at the Linz Open she partnered with countrywoman Alice Noháčová in the doubles event. But semi-finals lost Dutch Monique Kiene and Miriam Oremans.

ITF Finals

Singles: 3 (2–1)

Doubles: 16 (8–8)

References

External links
 
 

1973 births
Living people
Czech female tennis players
Czechoslovak female tennis players